The 2017 Chiapas earthquake struck at 23:49 CDT on 7 September (local time; 04:49 on the 8th UTC) in the Gulf of Tehuantepec off the southern coast of Mexico near the state of Chiapas, approximately  southwest of Pijijiapan (alternately,  south-southwest of Tres Picos), with a Mercalli intensity of IX (Violent). The moment magnitude was estimated to be .

The earthquake caused all of Mexico City to tremble, prompting people to evacuate after the early warning system was triggered. Mexico's president called it the strongest earthquake recorded in the country in a century. It was also the second strongest recorded in the country's history, behind the magnitude 8.6 earthquake in 1787, and the largest recorded globally in 2017.

Tectonic setting 
The Gulf of Tehuantepec lies above the convergent boundary where the Cocos Plate is being subducted below the North American Plate at a rate of 6.4 cm/yr (2.5 in/yr).

Background 
On 6 September, several earthquake alarms in Mexico City were mistakenly activated, leading to the evacuation of buildings. The incident prompted a review of the system.

Earthquake 

The hypocenter was about  underground, deeper than usual for a relatively new subduction zone. The SSN reported a measurement of M 8.2, while the USGS also reported a M 8.2 earthquake after correcting an earlier estimate of M 8.0. The entire thickness of the lithosphere of the Cocos Plate ruptured during the earthquake.

The earthquake is the most powerful in Mexico to be measured by seismographs. Mexican President Enrique Peña Nieto called the earthquake the "largest in at least a century" and said that it was felt by 50 million people.

Geophysicists at the National Autonomous University of Mexico speculated that the earthquake relieved stored pressure in the "Tehuantepec gap", making future earthquakes in the region less likely.

Tsunami 
The Pacific Tsunami Warning Center issued a warning for the entire Pacific coast of Central America, also extending south to Ecuador.

Aftershocks 
In the hour following the earthquake, at least 12 aftershocks were recorded by the USGS. As of 00:30 September 14 (UTC Time), the National Seismological Service (SSN) has recorded at least 1,806 aftershocks, of up to a magnitude of 6.1.

Damage and aftermath 

Within Chiapas, an estimated 1.5 million people were affected by the earthquake, with 41,000 homes damaged. Jose Calzada, Minister of Agriculture, reported that at least 98 people had died in the earthquake, including 78 in Oaxaca, 16 in Chiapas and 4 in Tabasco. The Secretariat of the Interior declared a state of emergency for 122 municipalities in Chiapas, and the Mexican Army was deployed to aid in disaster relief. Schools were closed on 8 September in 11 states for safety inspections. Damage in Veracruz was reported, meanwhile the state is expecting the arrival of Hurricane Katia on 9 September. Hurricane Max made landfall in Guerrero state on 14 September, near the earthquake-stricken region.

Buildings in Juchitán de Zaragoza, Oaxaca, closest to the epicenter, were "reduced to rubble" according to reports from the town's mayor.

The earthquake also caused buildings to shake and sway in Mexico City, while also knocking out electricity for 1.8 million people. There were reports of glass shattered at Mexico City International Airport. A highway bridge under construction near Mexico City's new international airport collapsed due to the shaking.

The epicenter was near Mexico's border with Guatemala, where the quake was felt in Guatemala City, and infrastructure damage was reported by CONRED in the nation's south-west. President Jimmy Morales stated that one Guatemalan was killed.

Response 

On 11 September, Mexico recalled its aid to the United States, offered in the aftermath of Hurricane Harvey, to focus on earthquake recovery.

United States President Donald Trump called Mexican President Enrique Peña Nieto on 14 September, a week after the earthquake, to express his condolences.

Three years after the earthquake, Governor Alejandro Murat reported that 60,000 homes have been rebuilt, but that many others still have not been. He reported that sixty health centers have been reconstructed, and in 2020 they plan to rebuild 2,000 schools.

See also 

 2017 Puebla earthquake
 List of earthquakes in 2017
 List of earthquakes in Mexico

References

External links
 M=6.1 Mexican aftershock strongly promoted by M=8.1 Chiapas mainshock – Temblor, Inc.
 
 

2017 earthquakes
2017 in Guatemala
Earthquakes in Guatemala
2017
2017 earthquake
2017 earthquake
September 2017 events in Mexico
Megathrust earthquakes in Mexico
2017 disasters in Mexico